Demetria Martinez is an American activist, poet, and novelist.

Early life 
She was born on July 10, 1960, in Albuquerque, New Mexico. She is a graduate of Princeton University with BA from the Woodrow Wilson School of Public and International Affairs.

In 1988 Martinez was charged with conspiracy for allegedly transporting two Salvadoran women refugees into the US; she was working as a freelance reporter covering religion and the Sanctuary Movement at the time.  She was later acquitted of the charges. During the trial, prosecutors used Martinez's poem "Nativity, For Two Salvadoran Women" in an attempt to build a case against her, a decision Martinez has called a "major error."

Career 
Martinez has been an editor for the National Catholic Review in Tucson, Arizona, since 1990.  She teaches in the annual William Joiner Center for the Study of War and Social Consequences at the University of Massachusetts Boston.

Activism 
Martinez has been associated with the Sanctuary Movement and with Enlace Comunitario, an Albuquerque-based organization that serves immigrant families experiencing domestic violence.

Awards 

 International Latino Book Award for best biography (2006): Confessions of a Berlitz-Tape Chicana (University of Oklahoma Press, 2005)  
 Western States Book Award for fiction: Mother Tongue (Ballintine, 1997)  
 Thirteenth Annual Chicano Literary Arts Contest (first prize: poem):  "Turning" (Bilingual Press Review, 1989)
 American Book Award (2013)

Published works 

 Three Times a Woman: Chicana Poetry (includes the poem "Turning"), Bilingual Press/Review (Tempe, AZ), 1989 
MotherTongue, Bilingual Press/Editorial Bilingue (Tempe, AZ), 1994, translated into Spanish by Ana Maria de la Fuente and published as Lengua madre, Seix Barral (Barcelona, Spain), 1996 
Breathing between the Lines: Poems, University of Arizona Press (Tucson, AZ), 1997 
The Devil's Workshop, University of Arizona Press (Tucson, AZ), 2002 
Confessions of a Berlitz-Tape Chicana (Chicana and Chicano Visions of the Americas series) 
The Block Captain's Daughter (Chicana and Chicano Visions of the Americas series)

References 

American women novelists
Hispanic and Latino American novelists
20th-century American women writers
American women poets
Princeton School of Public and International Affairs alumni
1960 births
Living people
Writers from Albuquerque, New Mexico
20th-century American poets
21st-century American novelists
21st-century American poets
21st-century American women writers
American Book Award winners